Teuku Muhammad Ichsan (born 25 November 1997), commonly known as TM Ichsan, is an Indonesian professional footballer who plays as a midfielder for Liga 1 club Bhayangkara.

Club career

Bhayangkara
He made his debut in a match against Persegres Gresik United in the Liga 1. On 7 May 2017, Ichsan made his debut with a goal in the 79th minute against Gresik United.

International career
He made his debut for the Indonesia in the 2022 FIFA World Cup qualification against Malaysia on 19 November 2019.

Career statistics

Club

International appearances

Honours

Club
Bhayangkara
 Liga 1: 2017

References

External links
 
 

1997 births
Living people
Indonesian footballers
Indonesia youth international footballers
Indonesia international footballers
Association football midfielders
Liga 1 (Indonesia) players
People from Bireuën Regency
Sportspeople from Aceh
Bhayangkara F.C. players